Sar Rig-e Sum (also Romanized as Sar Rīg-e Sūm; also known as Sar Rīg-e Seh) is a village in Isin Rural District, in the Central District of Bandar Abbas County, Hormozgan Province, Iran. At the 2006 census, its population was 248, in 55 families.

References 

Populated places in Bandar Abbas County